T2 Trainspotting is a 2017 British black comedy drama film, directed by Danny Boyle and written by John Hodge. Set in and around Edinburgh, Scotland, it is based on characters created by Irvine Welsh in his 1993 novel Trainspotting and its 2002 follow-up Porno. A sequel to Boyle's 1996 film Trainspotting, T2 stars the original ensemble cast, including leads Ewan McGregor, Ewen Bremner, Jonny Lee Miller, and Robert Carlyle, with Shirley Henderson, James Cosmo, and Kelly Macdonald. The film features a new character, Veronika, played by Anjela Nedyalkova, and includes clips, music, and archive sound from the first film.

T2 Trainspotting was released in the United Kingdom on 27 January 2017, and worldwide throughout February and March 2017. It received generally positive reviews from critics and was a commercial success, grossing $42.1 million against a production budget of $18 million.

Plot
Nearly twenty years after stealing a large sum of drug money from his friends and making a new life in Amsterdam, 46-year-old Mark Renton suffers a heart attack in a gym. Though now two decades sober from heroin, he is undergoing divorce and imminent redundancy. Facing a mid-life crisis and depression, he decides to take a nostalgic trip back to Edinburgh. Daniel "Spud" Murphy has returned to a cycle of heroin addiction after separating from his wife, Gail, and losing custody of his teenage son, Fergus, whom he fathered shortly after Renton left. Simon "Sick Boy" Williamson abuses cocaine, runs a failing pub and engages in blackmail schemes with his Bulgarian girlfriend, Veronika. Francis "Franco" Begbie is serving a lengthy prison sentence and attacks his lawyer after having his sentence extended for another five years.

Renton visits Spud just in time to save him from a suicide attempt, offering to help him overcome his addictions. Renton visits Sick Boy at his pub, where Sick Boy attacks Renton, still furious from being ripped off. Afterwards, Renton meets Veronika and pays Sick Boy back his original share of the money. Unimpressed, Sick Boy informs Veronika that he plans to take revenge.

Begbie escapes from prison and returns to his estranged wife June's flat, meeting his college-bound son, Frank Jr., whom he forces to join him in burgling houses after ridiculing his son's choice of studying hotel management instead of committing crimes. He visits Sick Boy, who pretends to have heard of Renton living in Amsterdam and promises to provide Begbie with a false passport so he can travel to the Netherlands to exact revenge.

Renton, Sick Boy and Veronika fraudulently apply for a £100,000 EU business-development grant to turn the pub's upper floor into the business venture he had promised Veronika, a brothel disguised as a sauna. Veronika, however, finds herself attracted to Renton, and they begin an affair. Meanwhile, Spud joins in the renovation and befriends Veronika, who inspires him to write his memoirs. One of Sick Boy's blackmail targets reports him to the police, and Renton seeks legal advice from his ex-girlfriend, Diane Coulston, now a solicitor. The proceeds of their crimes are quickly used up in legal fees and Sick Boy's cocaine addiction. Renton manages to escape from Begbie after a chance encounter at a nightclub, but Doyle, owner of a rival brothel, kidnaps him and Sick Boy, drives them to the countryside, and intimidates them into abandoning their scheme, leaving them to walk back to Edinburgh naked.

Begbie visits Spud and, reading his memoirs, discovers that Renton left Spud his share of the money. Veronika arrives, and Begbie steals her phone, with which he sends messages to Renton and Sick Boy, pretending to be her, and asking them to come to the pub at midnight. Veronika takes Spud to her apartment and asks him to leave with her, promising him half of the £100,000. Spud fears he will spend it on heroin again, so she offers to give his share to Gail and Fergus. He helps transfer the money to Veronika's account by forging Renton's and Sick Boy's signatures. After reading another excerpt of Spud's writings about their encounter with Begbie's alcoholic father in the derelict Leith Central railway station, Begbie visits June's flat for the last time, apologising to Frank Jr. for his abuse and telling him that he (Frank Jr.) will be a better man than Begbie and his father were.

Spud arrives too late at the pub to warn Renton and Sick Boy of Begbie's ploy. Begbie knocks Sick Boy unconscious and chases Renton across the upstairs floor. He throws Renton through the floorboards, leaving him hanging by the neck from electrical wiring; Begbie tries to strangle him, but Sick Boy douses him with pepper spray and saves Renton. Begbie pulls out a sawn-off shotgun and tries to kill them both, but Spud hits him with a toilet bowl.

They leave Begbie in the boot of Sick Boy's car outside the prison. Veronika returns to her son in Bulgaria. Spud puts together his book of memoirs and mends his relationship with Fergus and Gail, who suggests the title "Trainspotting." Renton and Sick Boy resume their old friendship. Renton moves back into his now-widowed father's home and embraces him in reconciliation before going to his bedroom and dancing to a remix of "Lust for Life".

Cast 

 Ewan McGregor as Mark "Rent Boy" Renton
 Hamish Haggerty as young Renton
 Ben Skelton as 9-year-old Renton
 Connor McIndoe as 20-year-old Renton
 Ewen Bremner as Daniel "Spud" Murphy
 Aiden Haggarty as 9-year-old Spud
 John Bell as 20-year-old Spud
 Jonny Lee Miller as Simon "Sick Boy" Williamson
 Logan Gillies as 9-year-old Simon
 James McElvar as 20-year-old Simon
 Robert Carlyle as Francis "Franco" Begbie
 Daniel Jackson as young Begbie
 Daniel Smith as 9-year-old Begbie
 Christopher Mullen as 20-year-old Begbie
 Kelly Macdonald as Diane Coulston
 Shirley Henderson as Gail Houston
 James Cosmo as Mr Renton, Mark's father
 Anjela Nedyalkova as Veronika Kovach
 Steven Robertson as Stoddart, Begbie's lawyer
 Elek Kish as Dozo
 Simon Weir as Jailhoose
 Bradley Welsh as Mr Doyle
 Pauline Turner as June Begbie
 Kyle Fitzpatrick as Fergus Murphy
 Charlie Hardie as 9-year-old Fergus
 Scot Greenan as Franco Begbie Jr.
 Katie Leung as Nurse
 Michael Shaw as 20-year-old Tommy
 Elijah Wolf as 9-year-old Tommy

Archival footage included Eileen Nicholas as Mrs Renton and Kevin McKidd as Tommy MacKenzie from the first film. McGregor, Bremner, Miller and Carlyle also appear in footage from the original Trainspotting film. The author of Trainspotting, Irvine Welsh, appears near the middle of the film as Mikey Forrester, reprising his role from the first film. Carlyle also plays Begbie's father, the briefly seen wino in the Leith Railway Station.

Production 
In 2007, Danny Boyle declared his wish to make a sequel to his 1996 film Trainspotting which would take place nine years after the original film, based on Irvine Welsh's sequel Porno. He was waiting until the original cast aged visibly enough to portray the characters again. "I want them to look ravaged by the passing of time," Boyle explained. Having previously expressed doubts about a sequel, Ewan McGregor said in a 2013 interview that he would return for a sequel, saying, "I'm totally up for it. I'd be so chuffed to be back on set with everybody and I think it would be an extraordinary experience."

In March 2013, Boyle said the sequel would be only loosely based on Porno which he felt is "not a great book in the way that Trainspotting, the original novel, is genuinely a masterpiece". Boyle said that if the sequel were to happen, it would be for a 2016 release.

In May 2014, Welsh said that he had spent a week with Boyle, Andrew Macdonald and the creative team behind Trainspotting to discuss the sequel. Welsh said the meeting explored the story and script ideas. "We're not interested in doing something that will trash the legacy of Trainspotting. ... We want to do something that's very fresh and contemporary." That November, Welsh said that McGregor and Boyle had resolved differences and had held meetings about the film, saying "I know Danny and Ewan are back in touch with each other again. There are others in the cast who've had a rocky road, but now also reconciled. With the Trainspotting sequel the attention is going to be even more intense this time round because the first was such a great movie—and Danny's such a colossus now. We're all protective of the Trainspotting legacy and we want to make a film that adds to that legacy and doesn't take away from it."

In September 2015, Boyle stated his next film would be a sequel, tentatively titled Trainspotting 2. Later that month Boyle revealed that a script for the sequel had been written, and that filming would take place between May and June 2016. He hoped to release the film by the end of that year to commemorate Trainspottings 20th anniversary.

While promoting Steve Jobs in November 2015, Boyle reiterated the hopes of beginning principal photography for the sequel in May and June 2016, and said that pre-production had begun in Edinburgh. Boyle also clarified that John Hodge wrote an original screenplay for the sequel, and that the film would not be a strict adaptation of Porno. An earlier script was reportedly written about 10 years prior, but was scrapped so that the original cast would agree to return for a film sequel. The working title for the sequel was T2.

In November 2015, Robert Carlyle said he would return as Begbie. According to Carlyle, he and the other Trainspotting cast members had already read Hodge's script, which was set 20 years after the original. Carlyle praised Hodge's screenplay and said that T2 "is going to be quite emotional for people. Because the film sort of tells you to think about yourself. You are going to be thinking: 'Fuck. What have I done with my life?

In early December 2015, it was announced that Sony's TriStar Pictures had acquired worldwide rights to the film and that the original lead cast would return.

Filming 
Principal photography on the film began on 10 March 2016, in Edinburgh, according to Boyle. Filming was previously scheduled to take place in May 2016.

Soundtrack 
The official soundtrack was released on 27 January 2017. It features Blondie, the Clash, Wolf Alice, High Contrast, the Prodigy, Queen, Run–D.M.C., Frankie Goes to Hollywood, Underworld, the Rubberbandits and Young Fathers.

Release 
T2 was released in the UK on 27 January 2017, followed by rolling worldwide releases from 10 February 2017. The film was given a limited release in the US on 17 March 2017, followed by a wider release on 31 March 2017 in a few major cities. T2 also screened out of competition at the 67th Berlin International Film Festival.

T2 Trainspotting grossed £17.1 million in the United Kingdom ($21.7 million). It grossed $2.4 million in the United States and Canada, and $18 million in other territories, for a worldwide gross of $42.1 million, against a production budget of $18 million.

Reception

On review aggregator Rotten Tomatoes, the film holds an approval rating of 81% based on 250 reviews, with an average rating of 7/10. The website's critical consensus reads, "T2 Trainspotting adds an intoxicating, emotionally resonant postscript to its classic predecessor, even without fully recapturing the original's fresh, subversive thrill." On Metacritic, the film has a weighted average score of 67 out of 100, based on reviews from 42 critics, indicating "generally favorable reviews".

Robbie Collin of The Telegraph rated the film 3 out of 5 stars. Collin praised writer Hodge for refinding the voices of the characters, and called McGregor the dramatic linchpin of the film. Although the film doesn't match up to the first, Collin concludes "it's worthwhile on its own terms." Peter Bradshaw of The Guardian rated the film four stars out of five, saying it has "the same punchy energy, the same defiant pessimism" as the first film.
Ann Hornaday of The Washington Post called the film "respectable exercise in fan service".

Accolades

Future

In March 2017, Danny Boyle discussed the possibility of a third Trainspotting film, suggesting that it could be a spin-off centred on the character of Begbie, in a story based on the Irvine Welsh novel The Blade Artist. "I think [Robert Carlyle] would love to do that because it's an interesting twist on the character", Boyle said. "That may be made into a film. You couldn't call it T3 because, although some of the other characters come into it, they're only featured just momentarily. It's a solo story. You could call that a spin-off. [The Blade Artist] is a great read." Carlyle was likewise open to an adaptation of The Blade Artist. "We've been talking about that, I am up for doing it", he said at the T2 premiere in Edinburgh. "So maybe we ain't seen the end of Begbie just yet".

Boyle stated he would be more interested in directing a true sequel rather than a spin-off, preferring to work with all of the principal actors. "My affection is toward all four of them", Boyle said. "People regarded the first movie as being Renton's movie, and I never really saw it like that, though he does dominate because of the voice-over. I always saw it as an ensemble movie, so I'm still very much in that mode."

Irvine Welsh has also hinted that a Trainspotting television series is possible.

In December 2021, Carlyle confirmed that a Begbie spin-off series is in development.

References

External links 
 
 T2 Trainspotting facts at   screen sensations

2017 films
2017 black comedy films
2010s buddy comedy-drama films
2010s crime comedy-drama films
British black comedy films
British buddy comedy-drama films
British crime comedy-drama films
British sequel films
DNA Films films
Films about heroin addiction
Films based on British novels
Films based on multiple works
Films directed by Danny Boyle
Films set in Edinburgh
Films shot in Edinburgh
Films with screenplays by John Hodge
Punk films
Scots-language films
Trainspotting
Film4 Productions films
TriStar Pictures films
English-language Scottish films
2010s English-language films
2010s British films